Adventure Vision is a cartridge-based video game console released by Entex Industries in either August or October 1982. The launch price of the system was $79.95. The monitor, game controls, and computer hardware are all contained within a single portable unit. The LED monitor can only display red pixels. Four games were released, all of which are arcade ports. Either approximately 10,000 or 50,757 units were produced.

Adventure Vision was Entex's second-generation system following the Entex Select-A-Game, released a year earlier in 1981.

Description
Control is through a single multi-position joystick and two sets of four buttons, one on each side of the joystick, for ease of play by both left- and right-handed players. Rather than using an LCD screen or an external television set like other systems of the time, the Adventure Vision uses a single vertical line of 40 red LEDs combined with a spinning mirror inside the casing. This allows for an effective screen resolution of 150 × 40 pixels. The mirror motor draws a great deal of power from the batteries, which can be avoided by using the built-in AC adapter.

Games
Entex released four Adventure Vision games, all of them ported from arcades:

Defender, originally by Williams Electronics
Super Cobra, originally by Konami
Turtles, originally by Konami
Space Force, originally by Venture Line (similar to Asteroids)

Technical specifications 
 CPU: Intel 8048 @ 733 kHz
 Sound: National Semiconductor COP411L @ 52.6 kHz, headphone jack
 RAM: 64 bytes (internal to 8048), 1K (on main PCB)
 ROM: 1K (internal to 8048), 512 bytes (internal to COP411L), 4K (cartridge)
 Input: 4 direction joystick, 4 buttons duplicated on each side of the joystick
 Graphics: 150x40 monochrome red pixels
 Expansion port
 Dimensions:

Legacy 
A similar display technique combining red LEDs with a moving mirror was used by Nintendo in the 1995 Virtual Boy.

Because of the moving parts used by the system, many units no longer work, with an estimated 100 known operational units left.

On March 31, 2013 at the Revision demoparty, the first-ever homebrew/demo ROM for the system was demonstrated by MEGA - Museum of Electronic Games & Art. MEGA also released the source code for the demo as well as all development tools.

The system is supported by the MESS emulator and AdViEmulator.

See also
Vectrex

References

External links
 Video Game Console Library
 TheGameConsole.com
 Handheld Games Museum
 AdventureVision.com
 Mini-Arcade.com
 Games Database.org
 Picture and some information about Entex Adventure Vision (Dutch language)
 Information about the first Adventure Vision demo and the making-of
 Adventure Vision games playable for free in the browser at the Internet Archive Console Living Room.

Handheld game consoles
Handheld electronic games
Monochrome video game consoles
Products introduced in 1982
1980s toys